Some Shapes to Come is the debut album by American saxophonist Steve Grossman. It was released in 1974 by PM Records.

Reception

At AllMusic, critic Vincent Thomas writes about Some Shapes to Come that: 
At Record Collector magazine, viewer Jamie Atkins notes that:

Track listing

Personnel

 Steve Grossman – tenor saxophone, soprano saxophone
 Don Alias – drums, congas, bongos, bells
 Gene Perla – electric bass, acoustic bass, mixed by (mixing engineer), producer
 Jan Hammer – electric piano, synthesizer (Moog)

 Jamie Farfan – artwork (cover painting)
 David Le Sage – engineer (overdub)
 Mark "Moogy" Klingman – engineer (recording)
 Charles Suber – liner notes
 Anne Marie Schnider – photography by, design (cover design)

References

External links 
 https://www.discogs.com/Steve-Grossman-Some-Shapes-To-Come/release/1972876

1974 debut albums
Steve Grossman (saxophonist) albums